Željko Komšić (born 20 January 1964) is a Bosnian politician and diplomat who is the 6th and current Croat member of the Presidency of Bosnia and Herzegovina. Previously, he was a member of the national House of Representatives from 2014 to 2018.

Komšić already served as a member of the Presidency from 2006 to 2014, and was elected to the same office for a third term at the 2018 general election, thus becoming the second Presidency member overall, after Bosniak Alija Izetbegović, and the first, and so far only Croat member to serve more than two terms. He was sworn in on 20 November 2018, along with fellow newly elected Presidency members Šefik Džaferović (Bosniak) and Milorad Dodik (Serb). He was re-elected for a fourth term at the 2022 general election.

Komšić was a prominent figure of the Social Democratic Party, until he left it in 2012 to establish the Democratic Front a year later.

Although elected to the post of Croat member of the tri-partitive Presidency, many Bosnian Croats consider Komšić to be an illegitimate representative of their interests as he was elected mostly by Bosniak voters in the Federation, a Bosniak-Croat political entity which forms a majority of the country's territory and whose residents are eligible to cast ballots for both the Bosniak and Croat members of the Presidency (while the Serb member is elected by residents of the Republika Srpska entity).

Personal life and education
Komšić was born in Sarajevo to Bosnian Croat father Marko Komšić and Bosnian Serb mother Danica Stanić (1941 – 1 August 1992). His mother was killed by a sniper of the Army of Republika Srpska as she sipped coffee in her apartment during the siege of Sarajevo. According to many, this event was his breaking point, as at the time, he was enlisted in the Army of the Republic of Bosnia and Herzegovina. Komšić would go on to earn the Order of the Golden Lily, which was at the time the highest state order awarded for military merits. His maternal grandfather Marijan Stanić, who was a Chetnik during World War II, died two years before Komšić was born. The Stanić family hailed from the village of Kostajnica, near Doboj. Komšić's paternal family hails from Kiseljak. His paternal uncle was an Ustasha who disappeared during World War II. Komšić was baptised a Catholic, like his father. However, being a religious-skeptic, he left the Catholic Church. He is a self-described agnostic.

Komšić has a Bachelor of Laws' degree from the Faculty of Law at the University of Sarajevo. He was chosen to represent Bosnia and Herzegovina in selective annual Georgetown Leadership Seminar in 2003. His wife, Sabina, is an ethnic Bosniak. The couple has a daughter named Lana.

He was one of the signatories of the Declaration on the Common Language for Croats, Serbs, Bosniaks and Montenegrins.

Komšić is an avid supporter of Sarajevo-based football club Željezničar, even having a membership card of the club, renewing it in July 2019.

Bosnian war
During the Bosnian War, Komšić served in the Army of the Republic of Bosnia and Herzegovina and received the Golden Lily — the highest military decoration awarded by the Bosnian government.

Early political career
After the war, Komšić embarked on a political career as a member of the Social Democratic Party (SDP BiH). He was a councilman of the municipality of Novo Sarajevo and in the city council of Sarajevo, before being elected the head of the municipal government of Novo Sarajevo in 2000. He then also served as the deputy mayor of Sarajevo for two years. When the "Alliance for Democratic Change" coalition came to power in 1998, Komšić was named the ambassador to the now defunct FR Yugoslavia in Belgrade. He resigned this commission after the election in 2002 when SDP went back into opposition.

First presidency (2006–2014)

2006 general election

Komšić was SDP BiH's candidate for the Croat seat in the Presidency of Bosnia and Herzegovina in the 2006 Bosnian general election. He received 116,062 votes, or 39.6% ahead of Ivo Miro Jović (HDZ BiH; 26.1%), Božo Ljubić (HDZ 1990; 18.2%), Mladen Ivanković-Lijanović (NSRzB; 8.5%), Zvonko Jurišić (HSP; 6.9%) and Irena Javor-Korjenić (0.7%). He was sworn into office on 6 November 2006. 

Komšić's victory was widely attributed to a split in the HDZ BiH party, enabling the SDP to win a majority of the Bosniaks votes. Croats saw Komšić as an illegitimate representative of the Bosnian Croats because he was elected mostly by Bosniak voters.

2010 general election

At the 2010 general election, Komšić won 337,065 votes, 60.6% of total. He was followed by Borjana Krišto (HDZ BiH; 19.7%), Martin Raguž (HK; 10.8%), Jerko Ivanković Lijanović (NSRzB; 8.1%), Pero Galić (0.3%), Mile Kutle (0.2%) and Ferdo Galić (0.2%).

Komšić's electoral win in 2010 was highly contested by Croat political representatives and generally seen as electoral fraud. Namely, every citizen in the Federation can decide whether to vote for a Bosniak or a Croat representative. However, since Bosniaks make up 70% of Federation's population and Croats only 22%, a candidate running to represent Croats in the Presidency can be effectively elected even without a majority among the Croat community - if enough Bosniak voters decide to vote on a Croat ballot. This happened in 2006 and in 2010, when Komšić, an ethnic Croat, backed by the multiethnic Social Democratic Party, won the elections with very few Croat votes. 

In 2010, he didn't win in a single municipality that had Croat-majority or plurality; nearly all of these went to Borjana Krišto. Bulk of the votes Komšić received came from predominantly Bosniak areas and he fared quite poorly in Croat municipalities, supported by less than 2,5% of the electorate in a number of municipalities in Western Herzegovina, such as Široki Brijeg, Ljubuški, Čitluk, Posušje and Tomislavgrad, while not being able to gain not even 10% in a number of others. Komšić received over seven thousand votes from the Bosniak-majority municipality Kalesija, where a total of 20 Croats live. Furthermore, total Croat population in whole of Federation of Bosnia and Herzegovina was then estimated around 495,000;

Komšić received 336,961 votes alone, while all other Croat candidates won 230,000 votes altogether. Croats consider him to be an illegitimate representative and generally treat him as a second Bosniak member of the presidency. This raised frustration among Croats, undermined their trust in federal institutions and empowered claims for their own entity or a federal unit.

Domestic policy

In May 2008, the Bosniak Member of the Presidency at the time, Haris Silajdžić, stated during his visit to Washington, D.C. that there is only one language in Bosnia and Herzegovina and that it goes by three names. His statement created negative reactions from Croat political parties and, at the time, Prime Minister of Republika Srpska, Milorad Dodik. Komšić replied to Silajdžić that he is not the one who will decide how many languages are being spoken in Bosnia and Herzegovina.

According to a study conducted by the National Democratic Institute in 2010, Komšić was the most popular politician among the Bosniaks.

After leaving the Social Democratic Party in July 2012, he and other dissidents founded the Democratic Front (DF) on 7 April 2013. The DF operates predominantly among Bosniak and pro-Bosnian voters in the Federation, and is characterized as a unitary, social democratic, and civic-nationalist center-left party.

Second presidency (2018–present)

2018 general election
Komšić announced his candidacy in the Bosnian general election on 11 January 2018, running once again for Bosnia's three-person Presidency member, representing the Croats. 

At the general election, held on 7 October 2018, he was again elected to the Presidency, having obtained 52.64% of the vote. The incumbent Bosnian Croat presidency member Dragan Čović, was second with 36.14%.

Domestic policy

In March 2019, Komšić appointed Serbian politician and businessman Čedomir Jovanović as his advisor.

On 20 July 2019, Komšić, for a record fifth time, became the new Presidency Chairman for the following eight months, succeeding Serb member Milorad Dodik. After eight months, on 20 March 2020, Bosniak member Šefik Džaferović succeeded Komšić as Chairman for, as well, the next eight months.

On 22 May 2021, Komšić and Džaferović attended a military exercise between the United States Army and the Armed Forces of Bosnia and Herzegovina on mount Manjača, south of the city Banja Luka in Bosnia and Herzegovina, while Dodik refused to attend it.

In November 2021, upon protests of miners over plans for job and wage cuts in the Federation of Bosnia and Herzegovina, Komšić commented on the events, stating "The director of the Public Enterprise Electric Utility should resign, as soon as minister Džindić and prime minister Novalić [Fadil Novalić] resign."

At the 2022 general election, Komšić was re-elected to the Presidency for a record fourth term, obtaining 55.80% of the vote. The Croatian Democratic Union candidate Borjana Krišto, was second with 44.20%. He was sworn in as Presidency member for a fourth time on 16 November 2022, alongside newly elected members Denis Bećirović and Željka Cvijanović.

COVID-19 pandemic

As the COVID-19 pandemic in Bosnia and Herzegovina started in March 2020, the Presidency announced Armed Forces' placement of quarantine tents at the country's borders intended for Bosnian citizens returning home. Every Bosnian citizen arriving to the country was obligated to self-quarantine for 14 days starting from the day of arrival. Tents were set up on the northern border with Croatia.

On 2 March 2021, Serbian president Aleksandar Vučić came to Sarajevo and met with Komšić and other presidency members, Džaferović and Dodik, and donated 10,000 dozes of AstraZeneca COVID-19 vaccines for the COVID-19 pandemic. Three days later, on 5 March, Slovenian president Borut Pahor also came to Sarajevo and met with Komšić, Džaferović and Dodik, and stated that Slovenia will also donate 4,800 AstraZeneca COVID-19 vaccines for the pandemic.

Military helicopters controversy
In August 2021, Komšić and Džaferović, without including Dodik, instructed the Ministry of Security to be available for putting out the wildfires in Herzegovina which had formed a few days before. This came after Dodik, as the third member of the Presidency, refused to give consent on the Bosnian Armed Forces to use its military helicopters to help in putting out the fires, because the consent of all three members of the Presidency is required for the military force's helicopters to be used.

Foreign policy

Following the 2018 general election and Komšić's election, largely due to votes in majority Bosniak areas, Croatian Prime Minister Andrej Plenković, who endorsed the incumbent Čović, criticized Komšić's victory: "We are again in a situation where members of one constituent people ... are electing a representative of another, the Croat people". Komšić responded that the Croatian Government is undermining Bosnia and Herzegovina and its sovereignty. Komšić also announced that Bosnia and Herzegovina might sue Croatia over the construction of the Pelješac Bridge. The construction of the bridge, paid largely with EU funding, began on 30 July 2018 to connect Croatia's territory and was supported by Komšić's main election opponent Dragan Čović.

In December 2020, right before a state visit of Russian foreign minister Sergey Lavrov, Komšić refused to attend the visit because of Lavrov's disrespect to Bosnia and Herzegovina and decision to firstly visit only Bosnian Serb leader Milorad Dodik and later on the presidency consisting of Šefik Džaferović, Dodik and Komšić. Shortly later, Džaferović too refused to attend Lavrov's visit because of the same reasons as Komšić.

In September 2021, Komšić went to New York City to address the United Nations General Assembly at its headquarters. There he held bilateral meetings with United Nations Secretary-General António Guterres and Austrian president Alexander Van der Bellen on 21 September. On 22 September, Komšić addressed the General Assembly, speaking about the political challenges in Bosnia and Herzegovina, the COVID-19 pandemic and climate change. On 23 September, he met with Montenegrin and Kosovar presidents Milo Đukanović and Vjosa Osmani.

In November 2021, Komšić attended the 26th United Nations Climate Change Conference, where he was welcomed by British Prime Minister Boris Johnson and UN Secretary-General António Guterres.

On 17 January 2022, he met with Pope Francis in Vatican City. Following their meeting, Francis praised Komšić, saying that "he is a good person." On 9 February 2022, Komšić went to Madrid, where he held a bilateral meeting with Spanish Prime Minister Pedro Sánchez and also spoke with King Felipe VI. 

Following Russia recognizing the Donetsk People's Republic and the Luhansk People's Republic as independent states on 21 February, which are disputed territories in the Ukrainian region of Donbas, Komšić strongly condemned "Russia’s attack on the territory of Ukraine." On 24 February, Russian president Vladimir Putin ordered a large-scale invasion of Ukraine, marking a dramatic escalation of the Russo-Ukrainian War that began in 2014. Regarding the invasion, Komšić said Bosnia and Herzegovina would support Ukraine within its capacity.

European Union

In September 2020, Komšić and his fellow Presidency members said that an EU candidate status for Bosnia and Herzegovina is possible in the year 2021 if the country "implements successful reforms."

On 30 September 2021, Komšić, Džaferović and Dodik met with European Commission President Ursula von der Leyen at the Presidency Building in Sarajevo. This was part of von der Leyen's visit to Bosnia and Herzegovina, since she some hours before opened the Svilaj border checkpoint and a bridge over the nearby Sava river, which bears the internationally important freeway Pan-European Corridor Vc.

On 1 December 2021, Komšić and Džaferović met with German Minister of State for Europe Michael Roth, with the main topics of discussion being the political situation in Bosnia and Herzegovina, reform processes and activities on the country's EU path.

Relations with Turkey

On 16 March 2021, Komšić, Džaferović and Dodik went on a state visit to Turkey to meet with Turkish President Recep Tayyip Erdoğan. While there, Erdoğan promised to donate Bosnia and Herzegovina 30,000 COVID-19 vaccines for the COVID-19 pandemic. Also on the meeting, Bosnia and Herzegovina and Turkey agreed on mutual recognition and exchange of driving licenses, as well as signing an agreement on cooperation in infrastructure and construction projects, which also refers to the construction of a highway from Bosnia's capital Sarajevo to Serbia's capital Belgrade; the agreement being signed by Minister of Communication and Traffic Vojin Mitrović.

On 27 August 2021, Erdoğan came to Sarajevo on a state visit in Bosnia and Herzegovina and met with all three Presidency members, having talks about more economic and infrastructural cooperation, as well as looking into the construction of the highway from Sarajevo to Belgrade. Also, a trilateral meeting between Turkey, Serbia and Bosnia and Herzegovina was agreed on and should happen in the near future.

Balkan non-papers

In April 2021, Komšić sent a non-paper to EU foreign ministers, fiercely criticizing EU Delegations for their too good attitude towards nationalistic Bosnian parties SNSD and HDZ BiH. His paper focuses on Russian influence, interference of Croatia and Serbia in the internal affairs of Bosnia and Herzegovina and the combination of relations between HDZ BiH and SNSD, but also criticism of the poor behavior of the EU in Bosnia and Herzegovina. The same month, Komšić reacted to a supposed non-paper sent by Slovenian Prime Minister Janez Janša, regarding possible border changes in the Western Balkans, saying that it was "all already orchestrated and only God knows what the outcome will be."

Orders

References
Citations

Bibliography

External links

Official web site of the Bosnia and Herzegovina Presidency 
Official web site of Željko Komšić  

1964 births
Living people
Diplomats from Sarajevo
Politicians from Sarajevo
Croats of Bosnia and Herzegovina
Bosnia and Herzegovina people of Serbian descent
Bosnia and Herzegovina people of Croatian descent
Sarajevo Law School alumni
Walsh School of Foreign Service alumni
Bosnia and Herzegovina diplomats
Signatories of the Declaration on the Common Language
Social Democratic Party of Bosnia and Herzegovina politicians
Democratic Front (Bosnia and Herzegovina) politicians
Ambassadors of Bosnia and Herzegovina to Serbia and Montenegro
Members of the House of Representatives (Bosnia and Herzegovina)
Members of the Presidency of Bosnia and Herzegovina
Chairmen of the Presidency of Bosnia and Herzegovina
Former Roman Catholics